Frederick T. "Fritz" Fraunfelder (born August 16, 1934) is an American ophthalmologist best known for his research interests in ocular oncology and adverse effects of drugs on the visual system.

Education and career

He received his formal medical education at Oregon Health and Science University, the University of Chicago School of Medicine, Johns Hopkins School of Medicine and Moorfields Eye Hospital at the University of London.  He is the founder of the Casey Eye Institute which is part of Oregon Health and Science University.   He is the author or co-author of 15 medical textbooks on the eye and well over 200 peer review scientific articles. He also founded the "National Registry of Drug-Induced Ocular Side Effects" which is a clearinghouse of information on adverse ocular events associated with drugs, chemicals and herbals. In 2008 he co-authored his first non-medical book, Retirement Rx (published in paperback as Retire Right). He has served as national President in multiple scientific organizations and as an associate editor and referee on multiple peer-review scientific journals.

Books
Drug-Induced Ocular Side Effects, 8th Edition, with Frederick W. Fraunfelder, Elsevier (2020), in press
Drug-Induced Ocular Side Effects, 7th Edition, with Frederick W. Fraunfelder and Wiley A. Chambers, Elsevier (2014), 
Clinical Ocular Toxicology (6th edition, formerly titled Drug-Induced Ocular Side Effects), with Frederick W. Fraunfelder and Wiley A. Chambers, Elsevier (2008) 
Drug-Induced Ocular Side Effects, 5th Edition, with Frederick W. Fraunfelder, Butterworth-Heinemann (2000), 
Drug-Induced Ocular Side Effects, 4th Edition, Williams & Wilkins (1996), 
Drug-Induced Ocular Side Effects and Drug Interactions, 3rd Edition, Lea & Febiger (1989), 
Drug-Induced Ocular Side Effects, 2nd Edition (1982)
Drug-Induced Ocular Side Effects, 1st Edition (1976)
Roy and Fraunfelder's Current Ocular Therapy, 6th Edition, with F. Hampton Roy and Frederick W. Fraunfelder, Saunders Elsevier (2008) 
Current Ocular Therapy, 5th Edition, with F. Hampton Roy, Saunders Elsevier (2000) 
Current Ocular Therapy, 4th Edition, with F. Hampton Roy, WB Saunders Co (1995) 
Current Ocular Therapy, 3rd Edition, with F. Hampton Roy, Harcourt College Pub (1990) 
Current Ocular Therapy, 2nd Edition, with F. Hampton Roy, WB Saunders Co (1985) 
Current Ocular Therapy, 1st Edition, with F. Hampton Roy, (1980)
Retire Right: 8 Scientifically Proven Traits You Need for a Happy, Fulfilling Retirement, with James H. Gilbaugh Jr., Penguin Group (2009),

External links
OHSU profile
Casey Eye Institute profile
National Registry of Drug-Induced Ocular Side Effects

American ophthalmologists
Living people
1934 births
Pritzker School of Medicine alumni